Linda Ann Newson, FBA, OBE, is director of the Institute of Latin American Studies, School of Advanced Study, University of London.

References

Living people
Year of birth missing (living people)
Academics of King's College London
Fellows of the British Academy
Members of the Order of the British Empire
English geographers
Women geographers
Fellows of King's College London